Dickosteus is an extinct genus of coccosteid arthrodire placoderm from the Late Eifelian to Early Givetian stages of the Middle Devonian period. Fossils are found in the Orkneys and Caithness, Scotland. It is one of the few placoderms for which complete bodies are known.

Phylogeny
Dickosteus is a member of the family Coccosteidae, which belongs to the clade Coccosteomorphi, one of the two major clades within Eubrachythoraci. The cladogram below shows the phylogeny of Dickosteus:

References

Coccosteidae
Givetian life
Fossils of Scotland
Fish described in 1963